"Sweat (A La La La La Long)" is a song by Jamaican reggae fusion group Inner Circle, released in July 1992 as the lead single from their twelfth album, Bad to the Bone (1992). It was a number-one hit in Belgium, Germany, Israel, the Netherlands, New Zealand, Portugal, Switzerland, and Zimbabwe. The accompanying music video, depicting the group on the beach, was directed by Mathias Julien. Australian music channel Max included "Sweat" in their list "1000 Greatest Songs of All Time" in 2017.

Critical reception
The song received favorable reviews from music critics. Larry Flick from Billboard noted that it "clips along at a fun and swaying pace. Topping on the cake is a sing-along refrain and chorus that will be the soundtrack to a bright summer day." Troy J. Augusto from Cashbox stated, "Actually, this incredibly catchy and brisk pop/raga-tune will rule the summer airwaves as the band sweats all the way to the bank." Dave Sholin from the Gavin Report called it a "winner", adding, "one listen—slam dunk!" Another editor, Rod Edwards wrote that "complete with a "sing-along" chorus, the reggae/dancehall appeal of this song should continue their success in the U.S." 

James Masterton said in his weekly UK chart commentary, that "Sweat (A La La La La Long)" "is certainly a cod-reggae classic to rank alongside Girly Girly and Real Fashion Reggae Style which were both Top 10 hits in the mid-80s." James Hamilton from Music Weeks RM Dance Update described it as an "appealing but old fashioned pop reggae swayer". Malaysian newspaper New Straits Times constated that "their pop-reggae may not be all that provocative or tough-edged, but it's supple and eminently hummable." Andrew Love from Ocala Star-Banner picked the song as one of the "greats" on their Bad Boys album. Mark Sutherland from Smash Hits declared it as "a bounce-along beach party of a choon with a "la la la" chorus".

Chart performance
"Sweat (A La La La La Long)" achieved a great success on the charts particularly in Europe, where it was a top 10 hit in Austria (number two), Denmark (number two), Finland, Greece, Ireland, Norway, Sweden (number two) and the United Kingdom, as well as on the Eurochart Hot 100, where the single peaked at number two. In the UK, it hit number three on the UK Singles Chart, on May 16, 1993 and number six on the UK Dance Singles Chart. It is the group's highest-charting song in the UK to date, and it topped the charts in Switzerland and Germany for six and twelve weeks, respectively. It also reached number-one in Belgium, the Netherlands, and Portugal. Outside Europe, "Sweat" was a hit in Israel and Zimbabwe where it was peaking at number-one for three weeks, in Australia, reaching number two, and New Zealand, where it reached number-one. In the United States, the song peaked at number 16 on the Billboard Hot 100. And in Canada, it went to number 38 on the RPM Top Singles chart. The song was also ranked number 94 on the Triple J Hottest 100, 1993. It earned a gold record in Austria, with a sale of 15,000 singles, a silver record in the UK, where 200,000 units were sold and a platinum record in Germany, with a sale of 200,000 singles.

Music video
A music video was produced to promote the single, directed by Mathias Julien. In the video, the band performs the song on the beach among bathers. They are often seen in front of female dancers and a colorful backdrop in green, red and yellow. Other times, the band performs on a stage, in front of a large crowd. Occasionally there are some black and white footage. The video was later published by Vevo on YouTube in September 2018, and as of December 2022, it had generated more than seven million views. Julien would also be directing the video for the group's 1994 hit single "Games People Play".

Covers and adaptations
The popularity of the song has resulted in many covers and even parodies. 
The song in Malaysia spawned a parody song by Poe called "Alalalala Tuk (Jangan Saman)" (Please Officer, Don't Fine Me).

The winner of season 7 of the German music competition Deutschland sucht den Superstar in 2010 Mehrzad Marashi had it as his debut release after his win. The release also featured Mark Medlock winner in the same show in season four in 2007.

Track listings

 7" single "Sweat" (original version) — 3:46
 "Bad Boys" (original mix) — 3:50

 12" maxi, Europe "Sweat" (swemix remix) — 5:35
 "Sweat" (sweatbox construction) — 7:51
 "Sweat" (circle zone dub mix) — 5:09

 12" maxi, US "Sweat" (Don T's dancehall version) — 3:54
 "Sweat" (JJ's glamarama remix) — 5:27
 "Sweat" (Don T's dub version) — 3:53
 "Sweat" (Dave Morales def mix) — 4:53
 "Sweat" (Dave's def raggamuffin dub) — 4:07
 "Sweat" (original version) — 3:46

 CD single 
 "Sweat" (original version) — 3:46
 "Sweat" (sweatbox construction) — 7:51
 "Sweat" (circle zone dub mix) — 5:09
 "Bad Boys" (original mix) — 3:50

 CD maxi "Sweat" (original version) — 3:46
 "Sweat" (sweatbox construction) — 7:56
 "Sweat" (circle zone dub mix) — 5:14
 "Bad Boys" (original mix) — 3:51

 CD maxi - Remixes "Sweat" (swemix edit) — 4:20
 "Sweat" (JJ's glamarama remix) — 5:27
 "Sweat" (original version) — 3:46
 "Sweat" (JJ's ragga zone dub) — 4:16
 "Sweat" (DJ beats) — 2:30

 Cassette'
 "Sweat" (original version) — 3:46
 "Bad Boys" (original mix) — 3:50
 "Sweat" (original version) — 3:46
 "Bad Boys" (original mix) — 3:50

Charts and sales

Weekly charts

Year-end charts

Sales and certifications

Mehrzad Marashi and Mark Medlock version

In 2010, Mehrzad Marashi and Mark Medlock (both winners of Deutschland sucht den Superstar) released a joint cover version.

The song was a big success in Europe topping at number two in Germany, number seven in Austria and number 16 in Switzerland.

Peak positions

Year-end charts

References

1992 singles
1993 singles
2010 singles
Inner Circle (band) songs
Music videos directed by Mathias Julien
Number-one singles in Germany
Number-one singles in Israel
Number-one singles in Portugal
Number-one singles in Switzerland
Number-one singles in New Zealand
Number-one singles in Zimbabwe
Dutch Top 40 number-one singles
Ultratop 50 Singles (Flanders) number-one singles
Reggae fusion songs
Song recordings produced by Dieter Bohlen
Warner Music Group singles
1992 songs